Bhandari Ram VC (24 July 191919 May 2002) was an Indian recipient of the Victoria Cross, the highest and most prestigious award for gallantry in the face of the enemy that can be awarded to British and Commonwealth forces.

Details 
Bhandari Ram was born in Brahmin family 1919 at the village of Auhar, which was part of Bilaspur State (now Bilaspur district, Himachal Pradesh). He was  Sepoy in the 16th Battalion 10th Baluch Regiment, British Indian Army (now the Baloch Regiment, Pakistan Army), fighting against the Japanese Army in the Burmese Campaign during World War II, when he performed deeds during the Third Arakan Offensive for which he was awarded the VC.

The citation reads:

He continued to serve in the post-independence Indian Army, receiving promotion to subedar on 13 May 1958, and to subedar major on 30 March 1967. Bhandari Ram retired from the army in August 1969 with the honorary rank of captain. He died in 2002.

Awards

References

External links 

 Bhandari Ram
 

1919 births
2002 deaths
Indian World War II recipients of the Victoria Cross
British Indian Army soldiers
People from Bilaspur, Himachal Pradesh
Indian Army officers
Military personnel from Himachal Pradesh
Indian recipients of the Victoria Cross